The Serbariu coal mine museum  is a mining museum in Carbonia, Sardinia.
The museum is an Anchor point on the European Route of Industrial Heritage. The site is a part of the Geomineral Historical and Environmental Park of Sardinia, which is a member of UNESCO's Global Geoparks Network.

Context
The Great Mine of Serbariu was the largest mine in Italy, with 18,000 employees of whom 16,000 were miners. It occupied 33 hectares on the surface and 100 km of underground chambers. It opened in 1937 and was worked until 1964.

Museum
The museum, which opened 3 November 2006, shows the pit head works and an underground gallery with the tools used from the 1930s to the 1950s, and also concentrates on the social history of mining.

References

External links
 Museum Website (Adobe Flash)

Museums in Sardinia
Industry museums in Italy
Mining museums in Italy
European Route of Industrial Heritage Anchor Points
Coal museums